Site saturation mutagenesis (SSM), or simply site saturation, is a random mutagenesis technique used in protein engineering, in which a single codon or set of codons is substituted with all possible amino acids at the position. There are many variants of the site saturation technique, from paired site saturation (saturating two positions in every mutant in the library) to scanning site saturation (performing a site saturation at every site in the protein, resulting in a library of size [20 x (number of residues in the protein)] that contains every possible point mutant of the protein).

Method 

Saturation mutagenesis is commonly achieved by site-directed mutagenesis PCR with a randomised codon in the primers (e.g. SeSaM) or by artificial gene synthesis, with a mixture of synthesis nucleotides used at the codons to be randomised.

Different degenerate codons can be used to encode sets of amino acids. Because some amino acids are encoded by more codons than others, the exact ratio of amino acids cannot be equal. Additionally, it is usual to use degenerate codons that minimise stop codons (which are generally not desired). Consequently, the fully randomised 'NNN' is not ideal, and alternative, more restricted degenerate codons are used. 'NNK' and 'NNS' have the benefit of encoding all 20 amino acids, but still encode a stop codon 3% of the time. Alternative codons such as 'NDT', 'DBK' avoid stop codons entirely, and encode a minimal set of amino acids that still encompass all the main biophysical types (anionic, cationic, aliphatic hydrophobic, aromatic hydrophobic, hydrophilic, small). In the case there is no restriction to use a single degenerate codon only, it is possible to reduce the bias considerably. Several computational tools were developed to allow high level of control over the degenerate codons and their corresponding amino acids.

Applications 
Saturation mutagenesis is commonly used to generate variants for directed evolution.

See also 
 Sequence Saturation Mutagenesis

References

Genetics techniques
Molecular genetics
Mutagenesis